is a Japanese gravure idol.  She has released several DVDs and photobooks and has appeared in several TV shows in Japan.

In 2005, Natsume was featured in a video game called "Gal of the Sparrow 2", which also features other popular J-idols such as Chikako Sakuragi, Saori Yamamoto, Yuka Watanabe, Akari, Kaede Shimizu, Hitomi Okada and Hatsune Matsushima. This DVD/video game is sold only in Japan.

In 2009, she came in number seven in the online magazine AskMen.com's list of "Top 10: Japanese Models."

DVDs
 Pure Smile (2003)
 Miss Magazine 2003—Rio Natsume (2003)
 Peach2 no Shizuku (2004)
 Cosplay (2004)
 Go to Beach! (2004)
 Idol One (2004)
 Beach Angels: Rio Natsume in Maldives (2005)
 G-Girl Private+ (2005)
 Idol One: Rio Natsume Special DVD Box (2005)
 Missionary (2005)
 Cow Girl (2005)
 Diary (2005)
 Waterdrop (2005)
 rio no carnival (2005)
 natsume no kajitsu (2005)
 Idol Colosseum 2005-Road to Break! (2006)
 Erotica (2006)
 Milk-T (2006)
 Lemon-T (2006)
 Freedom (2007)
 Love Affair (2007)
 Naked (2008)
 Muse (2008)
 Mature (2008)
 Rio Bravo (2008)
 Moumou (2009)
 Young Sister Style (2009)
 Old Sister Style (2009)
 Lingeriena J (2009)
 My Girl (2010)

Picture books 
 R - September 20, 2003 J Cup  (2003)
 Rio-chan (2004)
 Rio no kisetsu (2004)
 Yurari (2004)
 Mitsuhime (2005)
 98 Gram Adventure (2005)
 J&J (2006)

References

Sources
  Alt URL

External links
 Rio's official Force Agent Entertainment profile
 "Girls on the Web" FILE.99: Rio Natsume (November 29, 2003) - An early interview and photo gallery
 Rio Natsume photos and tube movies
 Rio's personal blog at Ameba
 Rio Natsume links
 RioNatsume.com - Rio Natsume Unofficial Website - Pictures, Profile, Videos

1985 births
Japanese gravure idols
Living people